The West Indies cricket team toured Sri Lanka from 1 to 18 December 1993. The tour consisted of three One Day Internationals (ODIs) and a one off Test match. This was the first time the West Indies toured Sri Lanka, which hosted the first ever Test match between the two countries. A three-day tour match between West Indies and Sri Lanka Board President's XI was also played at the Galle International Stadium from 3–5 December.

The tour was disrupted by bad weather, only one of its five fixtures ran its full course. The Test match had less than 12 hours of play. The only other first-class match, at Galle, was even more abbreviated. Rain prevented a finish to the first one-day international and the third was turned into a 23-over match.

The tour was first projected to be a three-Test series. It was rearranged and shortened to accommodate the Hero Cup, a limited-overs competition in India in which both teams took part.

Squads

First-class match

Tour match – Sri Lanka Board President's XI v West Indians

Test match

This tour marked the first time the West Indies toured Sri Lanka for a full series, which included the very first Test match played between the two teams. Unfortunately the low scoring match was disrupted by the dreadful weather which only allowed for 11 hours' of play, and was very poorly attended. There was no play on day one and no balls were bowled on days four and five.

Sri Lanka won the toss and batted first, scoring 190 in under 100 overs with only a single half century in the innings by de Silva. The pitch was turning while the West Indies, for the first time in five years, played two front-line spinners, Harper joining Hooper. At Ranatunga's wicket, Sri Lanka were 130 for six. The seventh-wicket stand between Kalpage and wicket-keeper Dassanayake showed some defence however Ambrose effortlessly demolished the tail end

The West Indian innings were hardly as successful. The Sri Lankan spinners shared all ten wickets, Muralitharan claiming four of them. Losing four for 84, the fifth-wicket partnership between Richardson and Hooper gave the West Indies the lead. With the loss of that partnership the last six wickets went down for 36 runs. The match was drawn after 22 overs into Sri Lanka's second innings.

ODI series
Three ODIs were played, one before and two after the Test match.

1st ODI

Overnight rain reduced the game to 39 overs a side, the game was further disrupted and prematurely finished due to the dark clouds and furious thunderstorms. Both teams found it hard to score runs on the slow pitch, however Lara's drives and clips off the legs raced to the boundary despite an extremely heavy outfield; he hit eight fours in 118 balls. Scoring only 16 runs in the first ten overs of Ambrose and Walsh, as well as losing the wicket of De Silva and Jayasuriya forced to retire with cramps, the Sri Lanka batsmen readily accepted the light when offered after an indiscreet bouncer from Kenny Benjamin.

2nd ODI

After 18 limited-overs matches against the West Indies, Sri Lanka pulled off only their second win, with five balls to spare. Opening the batting, Haynes and Lara made a rollicking start with 128 from 26 overs, but were later bogged down by the spinners. After a thrill less innings, Sri Lanka entered the last nine overs needing 50 runs. The captain, Ranatunga, put Sri Lanka back on track attacking Ambrose for 12 runs in the penultimate over, levelling the scores and winning the match for the team. The West Indies gave away 18 wides finding bowling under the floodlights troublesome.

3rd ODI

Heavy rain reduced the final match to a 23 overs a side game. Walsh exploited the sweating pitch, which offered ample movement, to capture the first three wickets, crippling the Sri Lankan batting even though De Silva batted sensibly. The cruising West Indians were pressured by the spinners and the required run rate rose to 35 in five overs. However, Arthurton's gigantic six over extra cover eased the pressure and put West Indies on course for victory.

References

External links
 West Indies in Sri Lanka 1993–94, CricketArchive
 West Indies in Sri Lanka 1993–94, Cricinfo

1993 in West Indian cricket
1993 in Sri Lankan cricket
International cricket competitions from 1991–92 to 1994
Sri Lankan cricket seasons from 1972–73 to 1999–2000
1993-94
December 1993 sports events in Asia